Stoney and Meatloaf is the only album by Stoney & Meatloaf, a collaboration between Meat Loaf and female vocalist Shaun Murphy, released in 1971 on the Motown subsidiary label Rare Earth. Meat Loaf and Murphy met while performing with the Detroit cast of Hair.

Re-releases
The album was re-released several times with a different track listing under the title Featuring Stoney and Meat Loaf. Firstly in 1978 and 1979 on the Prodigal label (PDL 2010) and again in 1986 on Tamla Motown (ZL 72217). The album contained most (but not all) of the tracks on the original album; "(I'd Love to Be) As Heavy as Jesus" and "Game of Love" were not on the reissue. In addition to three new tracks ("Stone Heart", "Who is the Leader of the People" and "Everything Under the Sun"), some songs appear in different versions and in some cases, different song titles.

The album is being released on CD for the first time in remastered 2-disc form by Real Gone Music and Second Disc Records in 2022.  The release will contain a selection of bonus tracks including new mixes of the additional songs originally released on the 1978 reissue of the album, as well as both sides of Stoney's solo single for Motown, and unreleased outtakes from Stoney's solo sessions.

Reception

Louder ranked Stoney & Meatloaf as the sixth best Meat Loaf album, calling it a "minor gem" and "a frothy stew of brass and thunder". Although Allmusic deemed the songs to be "second-tier", the singers' performances were praised, and the site said the album was "Worth picking up for a buck or two out of a used bin".

Other Releases of Stoney & Meatloaf Material
The track "(I'd Love to Be) As Heavy as Jesus" was included in the 1971 Motown gospel compilation Rock Gospel: The Key to the Kingdom, alongside tracks by label stars The Supremes, Valerie Simpson, Marvin Gaye, The Jackson 5, Gladys Knight & The Pips and others.

Track listing

1971 original release

Producers: Ralph Terrana, Russ Terrana, Mike Valvano
Arrangers: Tom Baird and David Van De Pitte

1978/1979 re-release Meat Loaf featuring Stoney and Meatloaf

Producers: Ralph Terrana, Russ Terrana, Mike Valvano
Producers on "Who Is the Leader of the People?": Nick Zesses and Dino Fekaris
Arrangers: Tom Baird and David Van De Pitte
Remixed and remastered at Motown Recording Studios, Hollywood, California
Remix engineer: Glen Jordan
Mastering engineer: Jack Andrews

2022 re-release Everything Under the Sun: The Motown Sessions

Personnel
Lead vocals: Meat Loaf, Stoney Murphy
Backing vocals: Mike Campbell, Telma Hopkins, Joyce Vincent
Instrumentation by The Funk Brothers, Scorpion (Bob Babbitt, Mike Campbell, Ray Monette and Andrew Smith) and Ralph Terrana
Instrumentation on "Game of Love" and "Jimmy Bell": Charlie Irwin, Richard Ponte, Jim Simmons and Scott Strong

Singles
"What You See Is What You Get" (b/w "Lady Be Mine" [Edit])
"It Takes All Kinds of People" (b/w "The Way You Do the Things You Do")

Charts

References

Meat Loaf albums
1971 debut albums
Vocal duet albums